Lipaphnaeus aderna, the bramble false hairstreak or blue silver speckle, is a butterfly in the family Lycaenidae. It is found in Sierra Leone, Liberia, Ivory Coast, Ghana, Nigeria, Cameroon, the Democratic Republic of the Congo, Uganda, Kenya, Tanzania, Malawi, Mozambique and Zimbabwe. The habitat consists of forests and dense savanna.

Both sexes have been recorded on flowering shrubs in sunny glades. Adult males mud puddle. Adults are probably on wing year-round, with peaks from August to October and again from March to May.

The larvae feed on Maesa lanceolata. They are associated with ants of the genus Crematogaster.

Subspecies
Lipaphnaeus aderna aderna (Sierra Leone, Liberia, Ivory Coast, Ghana, Nigeria, Cameroon)
Lipaphnaeus aderna pan (Talbot, 1935) (Uganda, western Kenya, north-western Tanzania, Democratic Republic of the Congo: Ituri and Kivu)
Lipaphnaeus aderna spindasoides (Aurivillius, 1916) (south-eastern Kenya, Malawi, western Mozambique, eastern Zimbabwe, Tanzania: north-east to the Usambara Mountains)

References

External links
Die Gross-Schmetterlinge der Erde 13: Die Afrikanischen Tagfalter. Plate XIII 70 a

Butterflies described in 1880
Aphnaeinae
Butterflies of Africa